Hopea beccariana is a species of tree in the family Dipterocarpaceae. It is named for the Italian botanist Odoardo Beccari.

Description
It has buttresses. The bark is fissured.

Distribution and habitat
Hopea beccariana is native to Thailand, Peninsular Malaysia, Sumatra and Borneo.

Conservation
Hopea beccariana has been assessed as vulnerable on the IUCN Red List. It is threatened by conversion of land for agriculture and by logging for its timber. The species is found in some protected areas.

References

beccariana
Trees of Peninsular Malaysia
Trees of Sumatra
Trees of Borneo
Trees of Thailand
Taxonomy articles created by Polbot
Taxa named by William Burck